The Hubert H. Humphrey Building is a low-rise Brutalist office building located in Washington, D.C., in the United States. Originally known as the South Portal Building, the Hubert H. Humphrey Building was dedicated on November 1, 1977.  It became the headquarters of the United States Department of Health, Education, and Welfare (HEW).  After the department's education component was given to the newly created United States Department of Education in 1979, the newly named United States Department of Health and Human Services (HHS) continued to occupy the structure.

The Hubert H. Humphrey Building is located at 200 Independence Avenue SW in Washington, D.C. It is named for Hubert H. Humphrey who was a United States senator from Minnesota, and Vice President of the United States.

Construction
Planning for the structure began about 1965.

The building was designed by architect Marcel Breuer, in association with his design partner Herbert Beckhard and the architectural firm of Nolen-Swinburne and Associates. In the Brutalist style, it was one of the last buildings Breuer designed before his retirement. The Interstate-395 tunnel (also known as the "3rd Street Tunnel") and a major sewer line are situated beneath the structure.  The building is designed to act like a bridge over the sewer and tunnel, balancing on a few strategically placed columns. A grid of steel trusses (which taper toward the exterior of the building) extend outward from these columns, which are primarily clustered toward the interior of the building.  The exterior and interior walls and the floors hang from these trusses.  The second through sixth floors of the building are clad in precast concrete panels finished with a thin granite veneer, each of which contains two large windows.  The ground floor is contained by a glass curtain wall, and contains a lobby, exhibition space, and an auditorium.  The first floor is open space, broken up by the main support columns and three building "cores" which contain elevators and other essential infrastructure. The interior walls were prefabricated to contain electrical wiring, HVAC, and plumbing, and other essential infrastructure.  Due to the prefabricated nature of the interior, the cost of the building was reduced from $40 million to just $30 million. Dining facilities occupy the penthouse level of the building.  There is also a balcony around the penthouse, but it is unused. The lobby is paved with travertine, and originally held two tapestries designed by Breuer.

This creates a large plaza in front of the building. Because plants and trees could not be grown on the plaza due to the deleterious effects their roots would have on the tunnel below, Breuer paved the plaza with concrete and included granite-lined depressions and small granite pyramids as decorative effects. In 1974, Congress passed legislation authorizing a major piece of public art to be placed at the south entrance to the Humphrey Building. In 1977, James Rosati's Heroic Shore Points I, a cubic aluminum piece painted bright red, was dedicated and emplaced.

Construction on the building began in early May 1972. Congress threatened to take over the building and use it for office space for the United States House of Representatives, but instead opted to raze a block of restored 19th century homes on New Jersey Avenue SW. In April 1977, as the Humphrey Building neared completion, one of the welds connecting the hanging interior walls to the roof truss cracked.  The roof sagged , and 200 workers were evacuated from the fifth, sixth, and seventh floors.  The beam was pulled back into position and rewelded into place. It was dedicated on November 1, 1977. The concrete work on the structure was poor in some places, with poor joints. Softball-sized chunks came loose from the concrete work shortly before the building was dedicated.

Dedication and use
The building was originally called the South Portal Building, as it served as a sort of gate or portal to the United States Capitol complex. But this was changed, and it was named for Hubert H. Humphrey, then serving as U.S. Senator from Minnesota, and previously Vice President of the United States. It was the first time a federal building had been named for a living person, although at that time it was publicly known that Humphrey was terminally ill with cancer, and Humphrey died on January 13, 1978, just seventy-five days after the building was dedicated on November 1, 1977.

, all of HHS's managerial and supervisory offices are contained in the building, but none of its operating divisions.

In April 2014, the General Services Administration said it would spend $6.74 million to renovate the Humphrey Building into open workspace. This would allow the Office of the Chief Information Officer to move into the structure.

References

Bibliography

Hill, Kathleen and Hill, Gerald N. Encyclopedia of Federal Agencies and Commissions. New York: Facts on File, 2004.
Miller, Jonathan. Compassionate Community: Ten Values to Unite America. New York: St Martin's Press, 2007.
Moore, Arthur Cotton. The Powers of Preservation: New Life for Urban Historic Places. New York: McGraw-Hill, 1998.
Thalacker, Donald W. The Place of Art in the World of Architecture. New York: Chelsea House, 1980.

Buildings of the United States government in Washington, D.C.
Office buildings in Washington, D.C.
Government buildings completed in 1977
Office buildings completed in 1977
1970s architecture in the United States
Marcel Breuer buildings
Brutalist architecture in Washington, D.C.